Michael Hinz (28 December 1939 – 6 November 2008) was a German actor.

Life and career 
Hinz came from an acting family, his parents were Werner Hinz and Ehmi Bessel, both actors, as well as his brother Knut and half-sister Dinah.

After growing up in Berlin and Hamburg, Hinz had his first theatrical role in 1958 in Terence Rattigan's The Sleeping Prince at the Thalia Theater in Hamburg. A year later, he starred in his first film, Die Brücke, which won the Golden Globe Award for Best Foreign Language Film and was nominated for the Best Foreign Language Film Oscar at the 32nd Academy Awards.

Hinz also starred in numerous films, such as The Longest Day (in which he played Manfred Rommel, the son of his father's character Erwin Rommel), television series, and was the voice actor for Jeff Goldblum in The Ray Bradbury Theater and Scott Wilson in the 1967 film In Cold Blood. He is best remembered for playing Uncle Quentin in the British television series adaptation of Enid Blyton's The Famous Five in the late 1970s.

Hinz's first wife was the actress Ingrid van Bergen, with whom he had his first daughter Carolin van Bergen, who later also became an actress. In 1967, he met the actress Viktoria Brams. They were married from 1968 until Hinz's death in 2008.

In October 2008, Hinz was found unconscious by his wife at home in Munich as the result of a stroke, spending three weeks in a coma until his death on 6 November. His ashes were interred at the Westfriedhof in Munich.

Awards 
 1963 Deutscher Filmpreis:  (best young actor)

Selected filmography

Die Brücke (1959), as Walter Forst
Stage Fright (1960), as Peter
The Inheritance of Bjorndal (1960), as Adelheid's Son
Gustav Adolf's Page (1961), as Schwedischer Kadett
 (1961), as Martin Berger
 (1961), as Hans
 (1961), as Jossip
The Phony American (1961), as Helmut Krauss
The Longest Day (1962), as Manfred Rommel (uncredited)
Only a Woman (1962)
The Lightship (1963), as Fred Freytag
 (1963), as George Kerr
Jack and Jenny (1963), as Josef Lancelot
Lana, Queen of the Amazons (1964), as Matteo
Aunt Frieda (1965), as Karl Schultheiss
Onkel Filser – Allerneueste Lausbubengeschichten (1966), as Max von Rupp
 (1967), as Jagdflieger
 (1969)
The Last Escape (1970), as Junior SS Officer
Four Times That Night (1971), as Rudy
Return of Halleluja (1972), as Lt. Von Steffen
Love Bavarian Style (1973), as Heino (uncredited)
Magdalena – vom Teufel besessen (1974), as Dr. Stone
Touch Me Not (1974), as Cory
Champagner aus dem Knobelbecher (1975), as Unteroffizier
The Spy Who Never Was (1976), as Martin
 (1977, TV film), as Hubert Rogers
The Famous Five (1978–79, TV series), as Quentin Kirrin
The Death of Mario Ricci (1983), as Otto Schmidhauser

References

External links 

 

1939 births
2008 deaths
Male actors from Berlin
Male actors from Hamburg
German male film actors
German male stage actors
German male television actors
German male voice actors
20th-century German male actors
21st-century German male actors
Burials at the Westfriedhof (Munich)